Fron is a former municipality in the old Oppland county, Norway. The  municipality has existed twice: from 1838-1851 and again from 1966-1977. The municipality was dissolved in 1977 and split up into the present-day municipalities of Nord-Fron and Sør-Fron which are both part of Innlandet county. The administrative centre of Fron was the village of Hundorp where the Sør-Fron Church is located.

History
The prestegjeld of Fron was established as a civil municipality on 1 January 1838 when the new formannskapsdistrikt law went into effect. On 1 January 1851, the municipality was divided in two. The northwest portion became Nord-Fron Municipality (population: 4,685) and the southeast portion became Sør-Fron Municipality (population: 3,421). During the 1960s, there were many municipal mergers across Norway due to the work of the Schei Committee. On 1 January 1965, the Sjoa area (population: 413) was transferred from Nord-Fron to the neighboring municipality of Sel. Then, on 1 January 1966, the municipalities of Nord-Fron (population: 5,758) and Sør-Fron (population: 3,648) were merged to form a new Fron Municipality (with similar borders to the old Fron municipality that existed from 1838-1851 minus the Sjoa area which was then part of Sel). This merger was not well-liked among the residents of the new municipality. On 1 January 1977, the merger was reversed and Nord-Fron (population: 6,131) and Sør-Fron (population: 3,509) were recreated using their old borders from 1965.

Since that time, there have been talks about reuniting the two municipalities once again, but the plans have not come to pass. In the 2010s, Nord-Fron, Sør-Fron, and Ringebu looked into merging, but this did not happen. Nord-Fron also made inquiries to merge with Sel, but this did not happen either.

Name
The municipality (and the prestegjeld) of Fron was named after the old Fron farm ( since this was the site of the first Fron Church. The meaning of the name is unknown (maybe "earth" or "land").

Government
All municipalities in Norway, including Fron, are responsible for primary education (through 10th grade), outpatient health services, senior citizen services, unemployment and other social services, zoning, economic development, and municipal roads. The municipality was governed by a municipal council of elected representatives, which in turn elected a mayor.

Municipal council
The municipal council  of Fron was made up of representatives that were elected to four year terms.  The party breakdown of the final municipal council was as follows:

Mayors
The mayors of Fron:
1966-1968: Paul Brenna (Ap)
1969-1975:	Tollef Beitrusten (Ap)
1976-1977: Asbjørn Myrvang (Ap)

See also
List of former municipalities of Norway

References

Nord-Fron
Sør-Fron
Former municipalities of Norway
1838 establishments in Norway
1851 disestablishments in Norway
1966 establishments in Norway
1977 disestablishments in Norway